An international regime is the set of principles, norms, rules and procedures that international actors converge around. Sometimes, when formally organized, it can transform into an intergovernmental organization.

Definition and types
Stephen D. Krasner defines international regimes as "sets of implicit or explicit principles, norms, rules, and decision-making procedures around which actors' expectations converge in a given area of international relations". Regimes "are more specialized arrangements that pertain to well-defined activities, resources, or geographical areas and often involve only some subset of the members of international society", according to Oran R. Young.

Types of regimes include International Conventions such as the Basel Convention, the Mediterranean Action Plan and well-known regimes like the Bretton Woods System of monetary management. International Regimes might also include international organizations in a broader sense.

Formation
International regimes often form in response to a need to coordinate behavior among countries around an issue. In the absence of an overarching regime, for instance, telecommunications between countries would have to be governed by numerous bilateral agreements, which would become impossibly complex to administer worldwide. A regime such as ITU serves simultaneously as a forum, a multilateral treaty, and a governing body to standardize telecommunications across countries efficiently. The International Monetary Fund, Biological Weapons Convention, and Kyoto Protocol are other examples of international regimes.  The number of international regimes has increased dramatically since the Second World War, and today regimes cover almost all aspects of international relations that might require coordination among countries, from security issues (such as weapons non-proliferation or collective defense), to trade, finance, and investment, information and communication, human rights, the environment, and management of outer space—to name a few.

Some scholars emphasize the importance of a hegemon in creating a regime and giving it momentum. This is called the hegemonic stability theory. The United States, for example, has been instrumental in creating the Bretton Woods system, with organizations such as the World Bank and the International Monetary Fund. The rationale is that a hegemon, being the dominant actor in international politics and economics, often stands to gain the most from the creation of global standards. For instance, while other countries might benefit from it, U.S. companies like Microsoft, Universal Studios, and Pfizer would be among the greatest beneficiaries of a strict global intellectual property regime. As the hegemons use their power to create regimes, their withdrawal similarly can also threaten the effectiveness of regimes.

Proponents and critics
Regimes serve crucial functional needs in international relations. Powerful regimes are considered by some scholars as independent actors in international politics. Although ultimately states create and sustain regimes, once institutionalized, regimes can exert influence in world politics that is practically independent of state sovereignty. The International Atomic Energy Agency, for instance, has certain rights, given to it by states themselves, to monitor nuclear energy activity in countries. Insofar as they are organized by means of treaties among countries, regimes provide an important source of formal international law. Regimes themselves can also be subjects of international law. Insofar as they shape the behavior of states, the most influential regimes can also be a source of customary international law. In this light, some liberal scholars see in regimes the early seeds of peaceful world governance, in the vein of philosopher Immanuel Kant's idea of perpetual peace through a federation of world's states. 

Critics of regimes deplore their influence as a source of additional conflict or inefficiency in world politics. The security regime organized around the United Nations Security Council is sometimes cited as a case in point. Some other scholars are also alarmed that regimes represent a dilution of democratic control. Although they govern and influence important aspects of life, they operate steps removed from domestic democratic politics, organized around a legislature. In effect, some critics argue, most regimes come to represent the technocratic views of international civil servants, with agreements made behind closed doors, rather than being subject to openness and democratic popular representation. Some regimes, such as the World Trade Organization (WTO) have tried to address this "democratic deficit" by establishing civilian affairs departments, which are supposed to act as a liaison to the popular will. Most regimes are still insulated from the direct democratic politics that happen within states. Some, however, consider such insulation necessary, since much of international coordination require specialized expertise provided best by technocrats.

See also
 Danube River Conference of 1948
 International Organization
 Regime theory

References

International relations